Buy is the name of several inhabited localities in Russia.

Urban localities
Buy, Kostroma Oblast, a town in Kostroma Oblast

Rural localities
Buy, Republic of Buryatia, a selo in Uzkolugsky Selsoviet of Bichursky District of the Republic of Buryatia
Buy, Tver Oblast, a village in Toropetsky District of Tver Oblast